Vampyria is a compilation album by Italian extreme metal vocalist Lord Vampyr, released on 21 December 2010, and his sixth release overall. The album is a compilation of two Lord Vampyr EPs – the previously-unreleased Vampyria, recorded in 2010, and Blood Bathory, released in 2007.

According to Lord Vampyr, the Vampyria EP was recorded as a tribute to the famous Italian goth club Vampyria Gothic Cafè in Reggio Emilia, for the tenth anniversary of their opening.

The lyrics to the Blood Bathory EP were all based on Hungarian and Romanian folktales.

Track listing

Notes
 Tracks 1-5 were taken from the Vampyria EP (2010)
 Tracks 6-9 were taken from the Blood Bathory EP (2007)

Personnel
 Vampyria
 Lord Vampyr (Alessandro Nunziati) — vocals
 Aerioch (Andrea di Nino) — bass
 Aeternus (Diego Tasciotti) — drums
 Prometherion (Fabio Palazzola) — guitars
 Seth 666 (Andrea Taddei) — guitars
 Lady Noir (Mariachiara Castaldi) — female backing vocals
 Endymion (Riccardo Studer) — keyboards

 Blood Bathory
 Lord Vampyr (Alessandro Nunziati) — vocals
 Aeshla (Francesco Struglia) — drums
 Alexiel — keyboards
 Nighthorn (Silvano Leone) — bass
 Nepesh-Ra (Cristiano Trionfera) — guitars
 S.K. — guitars

References

External links
 Lord Vampyr's official website

2010 compilation albums
Lord Vampyr albums
Industrial metal compilation albums